Luis Mercader Escolano (1444–1516) was the Grand Inquisitor of the Kingdom of Aragon from 1513 to 1516.

Biography

Luis Mercader Escolano was born in Murviedro in 1444.  He was a Carthusian.  He was appointed Bishop of Tortosa on 20 May 1513.  Pope Leo X appointed him Grand Inquisitor of the Kingdom of Aragon at the same time.  He died on 9 June 1516.

References

This page is based on this page on Spanish Wikipedia.
Profile from catholic-hierarchy.org

1444 births
1516 deaths
Carthusians
15th-century Aragonese Roman Catholic priests
Grand Inquisitors of Spain
16th-century Roman Catholic bishops in Spain